The  was a neighborhood in the village of Tobishima, Aichi Prefecture, Japan. It was the longest place name in Japan. The name has now been changed to simply Take-no-gō.

References

External links
Tobishima, Aichi

 

Geography of Aichi Prefecture